Pramod Chandra (November 20, 1930 – February 19, 2016) was an Indian-born American art historian, curator and the George P. Bickford Professor of Indian and South Asian Art at Harvard University from 1980 until 2004. In 1985, Chandra curated the exhibition The Sculpture of India: 3000BC-1300AD at the National Gallery of Art, Washington D.C.

Biography
Chandra was born in Varanasi, India, and attended Elphinstone College in Mumbai. His father was the museum curator and Indologist, Moti Chandra. After Elphinstone, Chandra obtained a Bachelor of Science degree from the School of Foreign Service, Georgetown University. He then returned to India and joined the Department of Art and Archaeology at the Prince of Wales Museum (now Chattrapathi Shivaji Vastu Sanghralaya) and secured a PhD from the University of Bombay (now Mumbai) in 1964. Chandra then moved to the United States to join University of Chicago, where he became a professor in 1971. He remained there until 1980, when he was appointed the George P. Bickford Professor of Indian and South Asian Art at Harvard University. He retired from the position in 2004.

Bibliography

References

Harvard University faculty
Indian art historians
American art historians
1930 births
2016 deaths
Elphinstone College alumni
Walsh School of Foreign Service alumni
University of Chicago faculty
American art educators
American art curators
Indian curators